The following is a list of titles that the South Sydney Rabbitohs have won. The premiership victories represent finals and grand finals won to decide the premier for the particular season. As minor premiers in 1914, 1918 and 1925, Souths were declared premiers under the "first past the post" system.

Premierships (21)

1 Balmain forfeited.

2 As minor premiers Souths were declared premiers under the "first past the post" system.

3 Undefeated during season.

4 Premiers in all 3 grades.

First Grade Runners-up (14)
1910, 1916, 1917, 1920, 1923, 1924, 1935, 1937, 1939, 1949, 1952, 1965, 1969, 2021

Minor Premiers J. J. Giltinan Shield (17)
1908, 1909, 1914, 1918, 1925, 1926, 1927, 1929, 1932, 1949, 1950, 1951, 1953, 1968, 1969, 1970, 1989

Club Championships (9)
1932, 1933, 1952, 1953, 1954, 1967, 1968, 1969, 1989

Tooth Cup Titles (1)
1981

Tooheys Challenge Cup Titles (1)
1994

World Sevens Titles (1)
1988

City Cup Titles (4)
1912, 1921, 1924, 1925

City Cup Runners-Up (2)
1914, 1917

Sports Ground Cup Titles (3)
1914, 1915, 1916 – won outright.

League Cup Titles (5)
1916, 1917, 1918, 1919, 1922

NRL Auckland Nines Titles (1)
2015

Pre-Season Cup Titles (5)
1966, 1969, 1972, 1978, 1994

Mid-week Knockout Cup Titles (1)
1981 Tooth Cup

State Championship Titles (1)
1932

World Sevens Titles (1)
1988

NSWRL Women's Premiership Runners-Up (1)
2018

NSWRL Women's Premiership Minor Premiers (1)
2018

Charity Shield (22)
1984, 1988, 1989, 1990, 1991, 1992, 1999, 2002, 2005, 2006, 2008, 2009, 2010, 2013, 2014, 2015, 2016, 2017, 2018, 2019, 2020, 2021

Second Grade Titles (20)
1913, 1914, 1917, 1923, 1924, 1925, 1926, 1927, 1929, 1931, 1932, 1934, 1943, 1945, 1952, 1953, 1956, 1966, 1968, 1983

Third Grade Titles (10)
1912, 1918, 1925, 1928, 1933, 1962, 1969, 1981, 1986, 1989

Munn Cup (3)
1908, 1909, 1910 – won outright.

President’s Cup (20)
1936, 1942, 1943, 1951, 1953, 1960, 1961, 1962, 1963, 1964, 1965, 1968, 1969, 1971, 1972, 1974, 1977, 1980, 1982, 1983

Jersey Flegg Cup (9)
1962, 1964, 1966, 1967, 1968, 1969, 1972, 1978, 2019

S.G. Ball Cup (10)
1965, 1969, 1974, 1975, 1976, 1979, 1980, 1986, 1994, 1998

Harold Matthews Cup (1)
1974

Junior Club Championship (1)
1986

Lennox Cup (1)
1948

See also

References

External links
Rugby League Tables & Statistics The World of Rugby League.
Rabbitohs Club Records National Rugby League.
South Sydney Rabbitohs South Sydney Rabbitohs official website.
Andrews, Malcolm. The ABC of Rugby League. Australia: ABC Books, 2006.

Honours
Rugby league trophies and awards
National Rugby League lists
Sydney-sport-related lists